Reunion is a master-planned community in Commerce City, Adams County, Colorado, United States. The Commerce City, Colorado Post Office (ZIP Code 80022) serves Reunion.

History

Beginnings
Reunion is the name of a master planned community, developed by Shea Homes beginning in 2001.  Previously the area was undeveloped agricultural land, between the cities of Commerce City and Brighton.  In the 1980s, Commerce City annexed the land and included it into the city's boundaries.

Governance and Community Covenant
Reunion is not an incorporated community.  It is located within the city limits of Commerce City.  The community utilizes fire from  the South Adams County Fire Protection District and police protection of Commerce City.  All public schools are part of the Brighton 27J School System.

As part of Commerce City,  Reunion is ultimately governed by the City Council of Commerce City. In addition, all Reunion residents are asked to sign and follow a Community Covenant. This covenant places firm guidelines on such issues as housing decoration, fencing, and contribution to the area's library and recreation centers. The covenant is enforced by the Reunion Homeowner's Association, or "RHA".

Boundaries
The generally accepted boundaries of the Reunion community are E-470 to the East, 112th Ave. to the North, Chambers Rd. to the West and (currently) 96th Ave. to the South. There are other undeveloped areas of Reunion that lie west of Chambers Rd and South of 104th Avenue.

Schools

High schools
 Prairie View High School
 Brighton High School

Middle schools
 Prairie View Middle School
Otho E. Stuart Middle School

Elementary schools
 Landmark Academy Charter School
 Second Creek Elementary School
 Turnberry Elementary School
 Reunion Elementary School

References

External links
Official Reunion Homepage
Reunion Community Site
Reunion-Colorado.com
 City of Commerce City

Commerce City, Colorado
Neighborhoods in Colorado
Planned communities in the United States